Bob "Bombardier" Satterfield (November 9, 1923 in St. Louis, Missouri – June 1, 1977) was a heavyweight boxer who fought from 1945–1957. Satterfield, who never fought for the title, retired with a record of 50 wins (35 KOs), 25 losses and 4 draws. He is in Ring magazine's list of 100 greatest punchers of all time at number 58. Satterfield later died from cancer at the age of 53.

Amateur career
Satterfield was the Chicago City Golden Gloves 147-pound champion in 1941.  He lost to Al Tribuani on a first round knockout in the inter-city championship between Chicago and New York boxers.

Professional career
Satterfield, known for his punching power and aggressive style, was a fan favorite. His poor stamina and weak chin often cost him fights, however. In his bout against heavyweight contender Rex Layne on March 9, 1951, Satterfield hurt Layne, and knocked him down for an eight count in the first round. Layne slowly retook control of the fight, and ultimately knocked out Satterfield in the eighth round.

Satterfield was knocked out in 7 rounds by future middleweight champion Jake LaMotta on September 12, 1946. He was also knocked out in 2 rounds by former heavyweight champion Ezzard Charles on January 13, 1954.  Satterfield did score a knockout over future heavyweight contender Cleveland Williams and also beat the dangerous giant Cuban Niño Valdés, but lost by KO to light heavyweight champion Archie Moore, and dropped 2 out of 3 to future light heavyweight champion Harold Johnson.

He retired from boxing on January 15, 1958, due to a detached retina in his left eye.

In the media
In the 2007 motion picture Resurrecting the Champ (based on an L.A. Times Magazine article) a reporter named Erik Kernan Jr. finds a homeless man claiming to be Bob Satterfield and writes an article about him in the Denver Times Magazine. The film stars Samuel L. Jackson, Josh Hartnett and Alan Alda and was directed by Rod Lurie.

Trivia
 Satterfield served in the United States Army from 1942–45.
 The 1999 story "Resurrecting the Champ" by J.R. Moehringer in the Los Angeles Times said that he was friends with musician Miles Davis and introduced Muhammad Ali to his first wife.  This was based on an interview in the Chicago home of his son, Robert Satterfield Jr.

Professional boxing record

References

External links

1923 births
1977 deaths
Boxers from Missouri
Heavyweight boxers
Boxers from Chicago
United States Army personnel of World War II
American male boxers